Stratiotes aloides, commonly known as water soldiers or water pineapple, is a submerged aquatic plant native to Europe and northwestern Asia. In Britain it was once common in East Anglia and still is in many places, particularly wet ditches and healthy ponds. It is the only species in the genus Stratiotes.

Invasive species

Stratiotes aloides has been found in the Trent River in eastern Ontario, Canada.

Description
Stratiotes aloides has a rosette of serrated leaves, lanceolate, up to 30 cm long in tufts.  White flowers are up to 45 mm across with many stamens in the male plants are produced in the summer.

Ecological aspects
In the summer this plant floats on the water surface with the leaves just above the surface. In the autumn they become covered with a slimy secretion (calcium carbonate) and the whole plant sinks to the bottom to rise again in the spring. Fossils have been found of this plant.

Plants are dioecious, male and female plants must be grown if seed is required. Only the female plant occurs naturally in Britain, though plants with hermaphrodite flowers are also found occasionally. Seed is never set in Britain, the plants increasing mainly by offsets.

Distribution
In Ireland, it is found in shallow waters where it was introduced. Apparently now extinct in the north-east of Ireland. Rare in east England.

Cultivation
Most suitable for the cool aquarium or pond.

Propagation from runners which form from the centre of the rosette of leaves.

The herb has had a high reputation for treating wounds, especially when these are made by an iron implement. It is applied externally. The plant is also said to be of use in the treatment of St. Anthony's fire and also of bruised kidneys.

References

 Clapham, Tootin and Warburg. Flora of the British Isles. Cambridge University Press 1962

External links
 IOW Fishkeepers
 Plants for a Future

Hydrocharitaceae
Freshwater plants
Plants described in 1753
Taxa named by Carl Linnaeus